Scarlet is the fourth studio album by Polish gothic rock band Closterkeller. It was released on January 16, 1995 in Poland through Izabelin Studio/PolyGram Polska. The album was recorded at Izabelin Studio from August to October, 1994. The cover art was created by Piotr Rosiński and fotos by Paulina Ochnio and Piotr Rosiński.

The album has reached a golden record status in Poland, with over 100 thousands copies sold.

Track listing

Personnel
 Anja Orthodox - vocal, lyrics
 Paweł Pieczyński - guitar
 Krzysztof Najman - bass
 Piotr Pawłowski - drums
 Michał Rollinger - keyboards
Michał Jelonek  - violin
Tomasz "Titus" Pukacki - vocal
Jacek Skirucha - guitar
Dariusz Ślusarczyk - conga
Music - Closterkeller.Track 9 lyrics - Cyprian Kamil Norwid and Tadeusz Gierkowski.

Music videos
 "Scarlett" (1995)
 "Owoce wschodu" (1995)
 "Dlaczego noszę broń" (1994)

Release history

References 

1995 albums
Closterkeller albums
Polish-language albums